Mia Pojatina (born 1995) is a Croatian model and beauty pageant who was crowned Miss Universe Croatia 2018 on 22 April 2018. She represented Croatia at Miss Universe 2018 pageant in Bangkok, Thailand.

Personal life
Pojatina has graduated from Medical Laboratory Diagnosis at the Zagreb University in Healthcare Department. She is a Volleyball player and a pianist for fifteen years. She married Filip Žaja in September 2021.

Pageantry

Miss Universe Croatia 2018
Pojatina was crowned Miss Universe Croatia 2018 held on 21 April 2018 in Zagreb. She was crowned by last year's winner and Miss Universe 2017 Top 16 Semifinalist Shanaelle Petty.

Miss Universe 2018
Pojatina represented her country at 2018 year's Miss Universe 2018 competition, but didn't reach the top 20.

References

External links
miss-universe-croatia.hr
missuniverse.com

1995 births
Living people
Miss Universe 2018 contestants
Croatian beauty pageant winners
Croatian female models
People from Brod-Posavina County